Neri Alberto Espinosa (born 4 July 1986) is an Argentine professional footballer who plays as a midfielder for Deportivo Maipú.

Career
Espinosa played for San Martín of Monte Comán, before appearing in fifteen fixtures with Villa Atuel in the 2005–06 Torneo Argentino B season. After periods with Sportivo Pedal and La Plata's Gimnasia y Esgrima, Espinosa joined their namesakes from Concepción del Uruguay. Six appearances followed in Torneo Argentino A. 2012 saw Espinosa drop back down to the fourth tier with Pacífico, subsequently netting four goals across thirty games. In 2013, Espinosa completed a move to Mendoza's Gimnasia y Esgrima. He won consecutive promotions as they rose from Torneo Argentino B to Primera B Nacional.

In pro football, Espinosa scored against Instituto and Juventud Unida but it wasn't enough as they suffered relegation to tier three. Gimnasia y Esgrima were promoted back up three campaigns later, with the midfielder taking his statistical tally to one hundred and twenty-eight matches and five goals in the process.

Personal life
In December 2015, Espinosa was involved in a fatal road traffic collision. He was travelling to his father's house when he collided with a motorcycle that was carrying two people, one of whom was driver Jorge Alberto Magallanes, 22, who died instantaneously while passenger Joel Cáceres, 19, suffered multiple injuries. In 2018, Espinosa was charged with culpable homicide by judge María Eugenia Laigle after it was determined Espinosa was not under the influence or excessively speeding at the time of the accident, as well as the fact he had no criminal history. He was handed a two-year suspended jail sentence and banned from driving for five years.

Career statistics
.

Honours
Gimnasia y Esgrima (M)
Torneo Argentino B: 2013–14

References

External links

1986 births
Living people
Sportspeople from Mendoza Province
Argentine footballers
Association football midfielders
Torneo Argentino B players
Torneo Argentino A players
Torneo Federal A players
Primera Nacional players
Club de Gimnasia y Esgrima La Plata footballers
Gimnasia y Esgrima de Concepción del Uruguay footballers
Gimnasia y Esgrima de Mendoza footballers